, known professionally as Kōki, is a Japanese model and songwriter.

Early life

Mitsuki Kimura was born on February 5, 2003, in Tokyo, Japan to actor Takuya Kimura and singer Shizuka Kudo. She had taken lessons in piano and flute, and won the Excellence Award at the 23rd Yamano Junior Flute Contest. She attended The British School in Tokyo and is fluent in English.

Career

Prior to debuting professionally, Kōki had written three songs for her mother Shizuka Kudo's album, Rin, in 2017, as well as for Mika Nakashima. In May 2018, Koki debuted as a model, appearing in the July 2018 issue of Elle Japon. Kōki has also appeared on covers for fashion magazines such as Numéro Tokyo, Grazia China, Nylon Japan, and Vivi.  In August 2018, she became Japan's youngest ambassador for the luxury brand Bulgari. In October 2018, Kōki appeared in her first commercial, endorsing products from Otsuka Pharmaceutical.

In 2019, Kōki appeared as a featured artist on Daichi Miura's song, "Katasumi", which was used as the opening theme song to the television drama Hakui no Senshi. Kōki also wrote the song. Kōki made her runway debut at the 2019 Paris Fashion Week, representing Chanel. In 2019, she appeared in the music video of the song "Eternal Love" by Kris Wu as the love interest. In 2022, she starred in the Japanese horror film Ox-Head Village.

Filmography

Film

Discography

As featured artist

Songwriting credits

Awards and accolades

References

External links

2003 births
Japanese female models
Japanese songwriters
Living people
Musicians from Tokyo
21st-century Japanese women